David Rosenmiller was an American politician. He served as the fifteenth mayor of Lancaster, Pennsylvania from 1884 to 1886.

References

Mayors of Lancaster, Pennsylvania